Demonoid is a Swedish extreme metal band founded in 2003 that derives its influences from traditional death metal, thrash metal and black metal.

Therion guitarist Kristian Niemann previously had the desire to produce more brutal music and had made earlier attempts with his brother Johan Niemann, although none of this earlier work had appeared on any records. Fellow Therion member Christofer Johnsson had later joined the project along with Rickard Evensand who was working with Therion as a drummer at that time.

History 
So far they have released only one album, Riders of the Apocalypse, in 2004. The album is about the Four Horsemen of the Apocalypse. Christofer never intended to tour and only joined as a session vocalist for the studio recording of the first album, and with two other members busy touring with Therion, Demonoid never played any live concerts.

On March 25, 2006, it was officially announced that Christofer Johnsson had withdrawn from Demonoid and that an unannounced replacement vocalist had been found. On October 7, 2007, the new singer was revealed to be Emperor Magus Caligula of Dark Funeral, and on the same day the new band website was opened. Since then, the band also opened a forum in which Kristian keeps fans up to date, leaving the website without updates since January 16, 2008.

On July 22, 2007, the band announced that the second album is in the process of being written with Kristian Niemann as the main creative force. As of November, 2008 all bass, drums, and rhythm guitars has been recorded. The album was to be released some time in 2009, but it is now stated to be delayed without a new release date.

In 2011, Emperor Magus Caligula joined Witchery, and left in 2012.

Band members
 Kristian Niemann - guitar (2003–present)
 Johan Niemann - bass (2003–present
 Richard Evensand - drums (2003–present)
Mario Santos-Ramos - vocals (2012–present)

Former members
 Christofer Johnsson - vocals - (2003-2006)
 Emperor Magus Caligula - vocals - (2007-2012)

Discography
 Riders of the Apocalypse (2004), Nuclear Blast

References

External links

Official websites

Demonoid at Nuclear Blast Europe
Demonoid at Nuclear Blast America

Online databases
 
 Demonoid at Encyclopaedia Metallum
 

Swedish death metal musical groups
Therion (band)
Musical groups established in 2000
Nuclear Blast artists